Amaranthus torreyi is a species of flowering plant that is sometimes considered to be a synonym of Amaranthus watsonii. Its common name is Torrey's Amaranth. It is native to the southwestern United States and northern Mexico.

References

External links
Jepson Manual Treatment
Photo gallery

torreyi
Flora of the South-Central United States
Flora of the Southwestern United States
Flora without expected TNC conservation status